Sanctuary Cove is a gated community and town in the suburb of Hope Island in the City of Gold Coast, Queensland, Australia.   It is completely self-contained residential environment with its own shopping centre and entertainment facilities, with the addition of many of the facilities of a holiday resort, such as boating marinas and golf courses.

It was the second of such developments in Australia (after St Hubert's Island) and is notable for its impact in planning legislation in Queensland to allow it to proceed, due to the privatisation of such large areas of urban land.

Geography 
Sanctuary Cove covers an area of 474 hectares south of the Coomera River close to its mouth.  To the east of Sanctuary Cove is Coomera Island. Sanctuary Cove continues to grow as remaining land is developed.

History
The property was developed by Mike Gore and launched in 1986.  In 1989 the resort was purchased by EIE International Corporation, a Japanese real estate investment company, with financial assistance from the Long Term Credit Bank of Japan. In 1992, following the downturn in the Japanese economy, EIE went into receivership, along with the Sanctuary Cove development company (Discovery Bay Developments Pty Ltd). The property was bought by Mulpha Australia Limited in 2002. On 9 April 2010 a new golf clubhouse was launched.

Resort
InterContinental operates a luxury resort hotel at Sanctuary Cove.  The hotel was previously known as the Hyatt Regency Sanctuary Cove as it was managed by Hyatt.  In late 2012, Intercontinental took over its management. During the COVID-19 pandemic, it underwent a renovation, at a cost of $6 million.

The hotel has 251 rooms. They are arranged in wings extending from the "Grand House", where the reception, the resort's two restaurants and a bar are located. All of the rooms have a view of the lagoon, the gardens or the marina.

The onsite food and drink facilities at the hotel include Fireplace, which offers fine dining, the Veranda Restaurant and Bar, the casual Cove Cafe, and a pool bar.

The marina contains 300 moorings for all vessels including superyachts up to 36 metres in length.

Governance 
Sanctuary Cove has a multi-tiered system of governance. Each Lot belongs to a Residential Body Corporate (RBC), of which there are 20. Lot owners elect an RBC Committee and Chairman.

Events 
It is home to the Sanctuary Cove International Boat Show which has been held annually since 1988.

References

External links
 Sanctuary Cove website
 InterContinental Sanctuary Cove Resort
 Body Corporate website

Gated communities
Hope Island, Queensland